Lena Papadakis (née Rüffer; born 23 August 1998) is a German tennis player.

Papadakis has a career-high singles ranking by the WTA of world No. 250, achieved in January 2023, and a career-high doubles ranking of No. 283, reached in July 2018.

She made her WTA Tour debut at the 2015 Nürnberger Versicherungscup, partnering Katharina Gerlach in the doubles tournament.

ITF Circuit finals

Singles: 5 (2 titles, 3 runner–ups)

Doubles: 9 (4 titles, 5 runner–ups)

References

External links

 
 

1998 births
Living people
Tennis players from Berlin
German female tennis players
German people of Greek descent